Back Home Again may refer to:

 Back Home Again (John Denver album), 1974
 "Back Home Again" (song), the title song
 Back Home Again (Kenny Rogers album), 1991
 Back Home Again, a 1976 album by Humble Pie
 Back Home Again (film), a 1952 film produced by Shaw Brothers Studio
 Back Home Again, a 2004 comedy starring Brett Harrelson, Petra Areskoug, and Williamson Howe
 Back Home Again, an upcoming 2D animated film based on the events of the 2016 Fort McMurray wildfire